The 2007–08 season was the 116th season in Liverpool Football Club's existence, and their 46th consecutive year in the top flight, which covers the period from 1 July 2007 to 30 June 2008.

Having finished third the previous season, Liverpool had qualified for the UEFA Champions League final qualifying stage.

First-team squad

Left club during season

Regular season

August
Liverpool began their Premier League season with a trip to Aston Villa, which they won 2–1. This was followed by the first leg of the Champions League qualifier, at Toulouse. The game, unusually played on a weekday afternoon, was won 1–0 by Liverpool.
Next came the first home game, a Premier League game against Chelsea. Liverpool took a lead through Fernando Torres's first goal for the club, but Chelsea hit back with a disputed penalty, ending the game 1–1. Referee Rob Styles appeared to book Michael Essien twice without sending him off, similar to Graham Poll at the 2006 World Cup. Styles later admitted to have made an incorrect decision to award the penalty and, unusually, apologised to Liverpool for his mistake; he was subsequently dropped for the next gameweek.

The third league game of the season, a 2–0 away win at Sunderland, was notable for Mohamed Sissoko's first (and only) Liverpool goal, after more than two years. This was also the Reds' 7,000th league goal. The following Tuesday saw Liverpool play Toulouse at Anfield in the second leg of their Champions League qualifying tie. Before kick-off, the Everton song "Z Cars" echoed around Anfield, in memory of 11-year-old Rhys Jones, a local boy who had been shot dead the previous week. The game finished 4–0 to Liverpool, and the team thereby qualified for the group stage courtesy of a 5–0 aggregate scoreline.

September
Liverpool won their first game of September against Derby County 6–0, Liverpool's biggest league win since April 2003 when they beat West Bromwich Albion by the same scoreline. This win took them to the top of the Premier League table for the first time under Rafa Benitez.	

After a two-week international break, Liverpool's next league game was away to Portsmouth. The match ended in a 0–0 draw, after Pepe Reina saved Nwankwo Kanu's penalty kick. The following week, the home league game against Birmingham City, ended in a similar goalless scoreline.

In between those two league draws Liverpool travelled to Porto to begin their Champions League Group A campaign against another team that had previously won the competition. The game, which ended 1–1, saw Jermaine Pennant sent off after receiving two yellow cards.

Liverpool got back on a winning track when they travelled to Reading for a League Cup third round tie. Liverpool beat their hosts 4–2, with Fernando Torres scoring his first Liverpool hat-trick. This was followed up with a league success, away to Wigan Athletic at the JJB Stadium, where Yossi Benayoun's 75th-minute strike—his second in two games—was enough to secure three points.

October
October's first fixture was the visit of Marseille, Liverpool's second Champions League group stage match. A spectacular individual goal from Marseille midfielder Mathieu Valbuena handed Liverpool a 0–1 loss, their first of the season. Disappointed Liverpool manager Rafael Benítez described the match as possibly the worst performance by the club under his management.

Liverpool remained at Anfield for their following game, the league visit of Tottenham Hotspur. A last-minute, injury-time, equaliser by Fernando Torres earned the team a 2–2 draw to preserve their unbeaten league record. However, Liverpool bounced back to win the away derby to fierce rivals Everton. The match at Goodison Park was a contentious one, with the referee's performance heavily criticised by Everton manager David Moyes. Dirk Kuyt scored two penalties that saw Liverpool come from behind to win 2–1.

The third of Liverpool's Champions League group games was a trip to Istanbul, where they had won the trophy in 2005. On this occasion, however, Liverpool fans had little to celebrate as their hosts Beşiktaş dealt their side's chances of progressing in the competition a serious blow by winning 2–1. The highest seeded team in their group, Liverpool were now bottom of their quartet with only a point from their first three qualifying games.

Liverpool finished the month with a pair of home fixtures. The league visit of Arsenal yielded a 1–1 draw, whilst the League Cup visit of Cardiff City, who featured Liverpool legend Robbie Fowler in their line-up, gave the Reds a 2–1 win and Nabil El Zhar his first Liverpool goal.

November
Liverpool began the month of November with a 0–0 away draw at Blackburn Rovers, further extending their unbeaten run in the league. They followed this by finally injecting life into their Champions League campaign with an emphatic 8–0 home victory over Beşiktaş. A hat-trick from Yossi Benayoun, a goal from captain Steven Gerrard and two each from both Ryan Babel and Peter Crouch gave Liverpool fans something to celebrate as Liverpool established a new record for margin of victory in a Champions League match (the previous best, 7–0, had been held jointly by Arsenal and Juventus).

On 10 November, the Champions League win was followed up with a Premier League one, as Liverpool beat Fulham 2–0 at Anfield. Fernando Torres came off the bench to break the deadlock in the 81st minute, and Steven Gerrard scored a penalty won by Peter Crouch four minutes later to seal the victory.

After another international break, the team's 13th league game took place, on 24 November at Newcastle United. Steven Gerrard, who had been booed by the Newcastle fans for his part in England's failure to qualify for UEFA Euro 2008, opened the scoring for the Reds and two more goals from Dirk Kuyt and Ryan Babel gave Liverpool a 3–0 win.

The team ended the month by hosting their penultimate Champions League group game, the must-win visit of Porto. Liverpool won 4–1 and, as Fernando Torres scored the first two Champions League goals of his career, club captain Steven Gerrard set a personal milestone of his own by equalling Michael Owen's club record of 22 goals in the Champions League.

December
The club kicked off a busy month by registering a 4–0 league win against Bolton Wanderers at Anfield. This win stretched Liverpool's winning streak to five games, during which they scored 21 goals and conceded just one, and continued their unbeaten league run.

However, this unbeaten start to the league season was cut short the following week when the visit to Reading resulted in a 3–1 defeat on 8 December. After the hosts converted a penalty for a challenge that television replays showed had occurred on the line, Steven Gerrard equalised for Liverpool before two second-half goals from Reading handed Liverpool their first league loss of the season.

Three days later, yet again needing a win to guarantee their survival in the competition, Liverpool travelled to Marseille for their final Champions League Group A fixture. Marseille had previously hosted English teams in Europe on six occasions and won all six times, and only needed a draw to progress themselves. However, Liverpool registered their second 4–0 win of the month to finish second in their group and progress to the round of 16.

On 16 December, Liverpool hosted arch-rivals Manchester United in a vital Premier League match. The match ended with a 1–0 victory for Manchester United, their fourth in their last five league visits to Anfield, giving the latter a nine-point lead over Liverpool in the Premier League. The only goal was scored by Carlos Tevez. Arsenal beat Chelsea 1–0 later in the day to give themselves a ten-point lead over Liverpool at the top of the Premiership.

Liverpool travelled to Chelsea for the League Cup quarter-final on 19 December. They were beaten 2–0 through a deflected goal from Frank Lampard and an injury-time goal from Andriy Shevchenko. Peter Crouch was sent off after a two-footed tackle on Mikel John Obi.	

Three days before Christmas, Liverpool hosted Portsmouth, looking to get their Premier League campaign back on track after two successive defeats. Liverpool continued a record of remaining undefeated at Anfield against Pompey since 1951 by triumphing 4–1. Fernando Torres scored twice to continue his good run of scoring, while the other goals came from Yossi Benayoun and a Sylvain Distin own goal. In the Boxing Day fixture, Liverpool managed a 2–1 victory over Derby, with goals from Fernando Torres and Steven Gerrard respectively, before playing out a goalless draw at the City of Manchester Stadium in their final game of 2007.

January
Liverpool's first game of 2008 was a home game against Wigan, which ended in a 1–1 draw. This was followed by their first FA Cup game of the season, the third round tie against Luton Town, which also finished 1–1. In the replay a week later, Liverpool beat them 5–0 at home, in which Steven Gerrard scored his second Liverpool hat-trick. On 26 January 2008, Liverpool defeated Havant & Waterlooville 5–2, despite going behind twice in the first half.
After that they travelled to Upton Park, where they faced West Ham United. An injury time penalty from Mark Noble saw them slump to a 1–0 defeat, their third of the league season.

Martin Škrtel was the first signing by Liverpool in the January transfer window. The undisclosed fee was rumoured to be £6.5 million, which would be the highest amount paid by the club for a defender. Mohamed Sissoko, who had found himself playing fewer games after the arrivals of Javier Mascherano and Lucas, transferred to Juventus, and Jack Hobbs, who had played some first team games this season, joined Scunthorpe United on loan until the end of the season.

February
Liverpool's first game of February was against Sunderland at Anfield, which was won 3–0. On 10 February, Liverpool travelled to Stamford Bridge and played out a 0–0 draw with Chelsea.

Liverpool played Barnsley on 16 February in the FA Cup fifth round and lost 2–1 at Anfield, but then beat Inter Milan on 19 February in the UEFA Champions League round of sixteen first leg, winning 2–0.

Their last game of the month, against Middlesbrough on 23 February, produced a 3–2 win for Liverpool, with a Fernando Torres hat-trick.

March
Liverpool's first game in March was away against Bolton which they won 3–1 through an own goal by Jussi Jääskeläinen and strikes from Ryan Babel and Fábio Aurélio, his first for the club. On 5 March, Liverpool played against West Ham. Liverpool won this game 4–0, with a goal from Steven Gerrard and another hat-trick from Fernando Torres, making him the first Liverpool player in over 60 years to net hat-tricks in successive home games. Three days later, Liverpool beat Newcastle 3–0 at home, with goals from Jermaine Pennant, Torres and Gerrard. On 11 March, Liverpool became the second English team in a week to win at the San Siro by winning against Inter Milan 1–0, with Torres again the scorer. Back in the league, Javier Mascherano scored his first goal for Liverpool and Fernando Torres scored his 20th league goal of the season, becoming the first player at the club since Robbie Fowler to do so as Liverpool won 2–1 over Reading. However, their seven match winning streak was ended when they lost 3–0 to Manchester United. Javier Mascherano was sent off by referee Steve Bennett for dissent after Mascherano questioned the controversial booking of Fernando Torres. Liverpool's final fixture of March was against Everton at Anfield. Torres scored the only goal early in the match, and Liverpool held on to win 1–0, giving them a five-point lead over Everton for fourth place.

April
On 1 April, in the Champions League, Liverpool faced Arsenal for the first of three consecutive meetings, a 1–1 draw at the Emirates Stadium with Dirk Kuyt scoring an away goal. On 5 April they drew 1–1 once again at the Emirates. Peter Crouch scored for Liverpool to take the lead but Nicklas Bendtner scored the equalizer for Arsenal, while Damien Plessis made his debut. In the third game, Liverpool beat Arsenal 4–2 (5–3 on aggregate) to reach the Champions League semi-final.
In the following game, Steven Gerrard scored in his 300th Liverpool appearance in the Premier League in a 3–1 home win over Blackburn Rovers. The following Saturday, Liverpool put out a weakened side against Fulham ahead of their semi-final first leg with Chelsea and won 2–0, with Jermaine Pennant and Peter Crouch getting on the scoresheet. On 22 April, Liverpool played Chelsea at Anfield in the Champions League semi-final first leg. Liverpool looked to be going into the second leg with a 1–0 advantage through Dirk Kuyt, but in the final minute of stoppage time John Arne Riise accidentally headed a Salomon Kalou cross into his own net, giving Chelsea a slight advantage through the away goal. The next Saturday, at Birmingham City, Liverpool again put out a weakened side before the 2nd leg with Chelsea. Damien Plessis started again, and Liverpool fought back from 2–0 down to 2–2, with Crouch and Benayoun scoring. That point secured fourth spot for Liverpool. The next Wednesday Liverpool played Chelsea in the second leg of the Champions League semi-final at Stamford Bridge, but lost 3–2 in extra time (4–3 on aggregate), sending Liverpool out of the Champions League.

May
On 4 May, Liverpool beat Manchester City 1–0 at Anfield. On the final day of the Premier League, Liverpool won 2–0 away at Tottenham, with Andriy Voronin scoring his sixth of the season and Torres' 24th league goal, breaking Ruud van Nistelrooy's record for the most goals scored by a foreign Premier League player in a debut season.

Premier League

Classification

Results by round

Results summary

Big Four Games

Cup Competitions

Football League Cup

FA Cup

UEFA Champions League

Third qualifying round

Group stage

Knockout phase

Round of 16

Quarter-finals

Semi-finals

Top scorers

Disciplinary record

Squad statistics
Last updated on 11 January 2009

|}

Transfers

In

Out

Loaned out

 In:  £29,950,000+
 Out:  £64,200,000+
 Total spending:  £34,250,000+

Reserves and U-18s

Summary
The reserves side were crowned champions of the Barclays Premier Reserve League North this season on 7 April 2008, the 17th reserve league title for the club. They became National Champions after beating Southern Champions Aston Villa Reserves 3–0 in the Premier Reserve League Play-off Final at Anfield on 7 May 2008. The reserves also reached the finals of the Liverpool Senior Cup and the Lancashire Senior Cup, and won the international football tournament Dallas Cup. Krisztián Németh, who scored 9 goals in 12 matches, was the top scorer in the Premier Reserve League North. The under-18s finished fifth in the Premier Academy League and qualified for the last 16 in FA Youth Cup. Nathan Eccleston was the best scorer in the youth team with 18 goals.

New players
After the departure of Steve Heighway, Dutchman Piet Hamberg came in to run the academy. As well as some changes to background personnel, the reserve and youth sides were bolstered by several new players:

Players this season

Reserves

 Squad numbers refer to players' first team squad number where applicable. Reserve and youth games are 1–11.

Under-18s

Records
 Mohamed Sissoko's goal against Sunderland was not only his first (and only) goal for the club but also Liverpool's 7000th league goal.
 The 6–0 defeat of Derby County was the first time Liverpool had scored six in the league since April 2003 against West Bromwich Albion.
 The 8–0 victory over Beşiktaş was the biggest ever win in the Champions League, surpassing two previous 7–0 victories by Juventus and Arsenal.
 The 4–0 win over Marseille was Liverpool's biggest away win in the Champions League.
 The 2–0 win at Anfield against Inter was Liverpool's 100th win at Anfield in European competition.
 Liverpool scored a hat trick in every competition they played in this season.
 Liverpool were the first Premiership team to score 100 goals in all competitions.

Notes

References

External links
 Fixtures and results
 Liverpool F.C. 2007–08 on LFCHistory.net

Liverpool F.C. seasons
Liverpool